Duchess Louise Frederica of Württemberg (3 February 1722 – 2 August 1791) was a Duchess consort of Mecklenburg-Schwerin. She was the daughter of Frederick Louis, Hereditary Prince of Württemberg and Margravine Henrietta Maria of Brandenburg-Schwedt. She married Frederick II, Duke of Mecklenburg-Schwerin on 2 March 1746. She had four children, who died young.

References

|-
 

  

1722 births
1791 deaths